Ballamodou "Balla" Conde (born 18 October 1973, in Conakry) is a retired Guinean footballer, who played as a midfielder.

Club career
Conde made his professional debuts at the age of 16 with Horoya AC in the Guinean League, making a substantial contribution as the team won three national championships. In 1997, after spells in Tunisia and Kuwait, he joined Penang FA in the Malaysian League, reaching and losing the domestic cup final in his first year at the club, and becoming team captain the following year, which ended in league conquest.

Conde would then play most of the following decade in Australia, starting with the Parramatta Eagles of the NSW Premier League where he played two years, helping the team to a final and a last-four appearance. Afterwards, he represented two teams in the Singaporean S-League, Gombak United FC and the Singapore Armed Forces FC, before returning to his previous country, signing with the Bonnyrigg White Eagles Football Club for 2004–05.

After a brief stint with FC Bossy Liverpool in the New South Wales Winter Super League, Conde joined Wollongong Football Club, playing with the Illawarra side until his retirement, at the age of 35. He stayed with the club subsequently, working as an assistant coach.

In 2016 Balla commenced his own academy training Australia's next generation of Football Stars. His academy based in St Marys, NSW coaches children from age 2 to All ages. Australian Football Generation Stars(AFGS) is now the Penrith regions leading academy.

References

External links
Wollong Wolves profile
Oz Football profile
Australian Football Generation Stars

1973 births
Living people
Guinean footballers
Australian soccer players
Association football midfielders
CS Sfaxien players
Parramatta FC players
Bonnyrigg White Eagles FC players
Wollongong Wolves FC players
Guinea international footballers
Guinean expatriate footballers
Expatriate soccer players in Australia
Penang F.C. players
Expatriate footballers in Singapore
Gombak United FC players
Warriors FC players
Geylang International FC players
Singapore Premier League players
Expatriate footballers in Malaysia
Horoya AC players